"Always on Your Side" is a song by American singer-songwriter Sheryl Crow from her fifth studio album, Wildflower (2005). It was released as the second single from the album in February 2006. While the original album version features only Crow on lead vocals, the radio version is a duet with British musician Sting. Sheryl Crow's Web site offered a free download of the new single to anyone who had already purchased the Wildflower album. A subsequent edition of the parent album features the duet version.

The song debuted and peaked at No. 35 on the US Billboard Hot 100, becoming Crow's 10th top-40 hit on the chart. The single also reached No. 2 on the Canadian Singles Chart and peaked at No. 30 in Hungary. The duet received a Grammy Award nomination in 2007 for Best Pop Collaboration with Vocals. The song's video was directed by Nigel Dick.

Charts

References

2005 songs
2006 singles
Male–female vocal duets
Music videos directed by Nigel Dick
Sheryl Crow songs
Song recordings produced by John Shanks
Songs written by Sheryl Crow
Sting (musician) songs